Diocese of South Carolina may refer to:
Episcopal Diocese of South Carolina (before 2012)
Episcopal Church in South Carolina, part of The Episcopal Church
Anglican Diocese of South Carolina, part of the Anglican Church in North America
Episcopal Diocese of Upper South Carolina
Roman Catholic Diocese of Charleston, which comprises the entire state